Vlad De Briansky (born Volodymyr DeBriansky;  3 January 1972), known professionally as Vlad, is an American guitarist, composer and educator. He is also an actor, record producer and a television producer. He plays blues, jazz, rock, and classical music

Music biography

Vlad is known for his virtuosity on a guitar. He had developed a unique technique playing guitar with his fingernails rather than a pick or attachable flat picks. He is also known for using his Fender Telecaster guitar combined with an overdone reverb effect.

Critics compared him to Wes Montgomery, Ry Cooder, Eric Johnson, Eric Clapton and Pat Metheny.

In his youth Vlad was a member of popular Ukrainian bands Forte, Tea Fan Club (Клуб Шанувальників Чаю) and Loony Pelen gaining popularity in Ukraine and Eastern Europe.

Born in Ukraine, but he moved to the United States to attended Berklee College of Music in Boston, Massachusetts, in 1996 by the invitation of the college.  While at Berklee Vlad studied guitar with Jon Finn and Norman Zocher. Soon after Vlad moved to New York City where he studied with Mike Stern and John Abercrombie.

During his New York period Vlad gets a job as an assistant producer at Hush Productions, where his guitar playing caught attention of one of the company's executives Beau Huggins who immediately offered Vlad a recording contract.

During that time Vlad also gets a management proposal from a seasoned music manager Ken Greengrass. During his New York period Vlad gets offers from Blue Note Records and Sony Classical but eventually signing with Orpheus Music. 

Collaboration with Orpheus lasted for 10 years. During this period Vlad makes California his home and in 2004 he releases his debut album 'Vladosphere"  on Orpheus Music label. The album became a commercial and critical success with its single "Little Star" climbing to #4 place on Adult Contemporary radio chart bypassing Phil Collins and John Mayer making him the only instrumental artist in AC top 40 radio chart in the US.

His second solo album Sun In Capricorn released in 2007 aired mostly on classical music radio stations around the US and received a praise from critics earning a Grammy nomination.

A move to Los Angeles brings Vlad a new collaboration with an esteemed songwriter Holly Knight with whom he cowrote many songs and produced several artists. He also introduced Antonia Bennett to Holly which resulted in two albums of Antonia produced by Holly Knight. Vlad had also worked in a role of a producer, songwriter or a guitarist with such notable artists as: Donna Summer, Lauryn Hill, Katy Perry, Tony Levin and Pat Mastelloto (King Crimson), Orianthi, Holly Knight, Skyler Jett, Billy Sheehan, Joey DeFrancesco, Rahni Song, Murali Coryell, Arno Lucas, Ray Brown Jr., Ruslana and many others.

In 2010 Vlad meets and collaborates with a Hollywood actor Patrick Bergin whom he invites to his project "Jacks Last Dollar". In 2014 Vlad releases "Jacks Last Dollar" and its "Part I" debuted as #14 on iTunes blues charts in the US. Subsequentially second album "II" was released gaining praises from critics and gets a moderate success.

In August 2016 Vlad releases a digital download-only album simply called "Blues". "Blues" reaches the top 10 downloads on iTunes Blues charts in Japan, United States and in Russia, reaching #1 in the Russia in September 2016 and #1 in US in May 2017.

A single "For You" was released on May 15 2018th. A new single "Dead Without You" is scheduled to be released on June 26 of 2018th.

His latest album "Dreamland" under his full name as an artist Vlad De Briansky was released on February 14, 2020, and it reached #1 on iTunes blues charts in Russia.

Vlad owns a Ukrainian record (official) and a World record on performing a guitar solo along with 100 guitarists on a song "Loner" by Gary Moore held on August 24, 2019, in Kalush, Ukraine.

Film and TV

In the fall of 2009 History Channel aired a series "Nostradamus Effect: Da Vinci's Armageddon" - where Vlad plays Leonardo da Vinci.

In 2013 he co-produced a popular TV music talent show "Boyuk Sehne" (Böyük Səhnə) aired in Baku, Azerbaijan, where Vlad as Jack Spade was also one of the judges.

Electric cars

Vlad is a spokesperson for the electric automobile company ZAP Automobiles.

Music education involvement
As an ambassador of the Berklee College of Music, Vlad founded the «American Music Academy» to bring legendary Berklee program to Eastern Europe. The school offers contemporary music education and music production. Among professors and advisors of the academy are Tom Rothrock, Reginald Love, Adam Joseph, Frank Parker, Rahni Song, and Gerry Brown.

Vlad holds a position in Artistic Board at Youth Philharmonic Orchestra (YPHIL) in New York City at Carnegie Hall.

Discography

References

External links
 Official Vlad's website
 Official Vlad's Facebook page
 Official Vlad's myspace.com webpage
 

1972 births
Living people
People from Kalush, Ukraine
American people of Ukrainian descent
American jazz guitarists
American rock guitarists
American male guitarists
Ukrainian jazz guitarists
Ukrainian rock guitarists
21st-century American guitarists
21st-century American male musicians
American male jazz musicians
Ukrainian emigrants to the United States